The 2011–12 Cypriot Fourth Division was the 27th season of the Cypriot fourth-level football league. Digenis Oroklinis won their 2nd title.

Format
Fifteen teams participated in the 2011–12 Cypriot Fourth Division. All teams played against each other twice, once at their home and once away. The team with the most points at the end of the season crowned champions. The first three teams were promoted to the 2012–13 Cypriot Third Division and the last three teams were relegated to regional leagues.

Point system
Teams received three points for a win, one point for a draw and zero points for a loss.

Changes from previous season
Teams promoted to 2011–12 Cypriot Third Division
 Ormideia FC
 POL/AE Maroni
 Achyronas Liopetriou

Teams relegated from 2010–11 Cypriot Third Division
 Digenis Oroklinis
 MEAP Nisou
 Iraklis Gerolakkou

Teams promoted from regional leagues
 Elpida Astromeriti
 AEK Korakou
 Kedros Ayia Marina Skylloura

Teams relegated to regional leagues
 Anagennisi Trachoniou
 ASPIS Pylas
 Enosis Kokkinotrimithia

Notes:
AEK Kythreas also participated in 2011–12 Cypriot Fourth Division. AEK's relegation during 2009–10 Cypriot Fourth Division forced the team to suspend operations. The team resumed operations in the 2011–12 season. According to a specific regulation, the refugees football clubs that were resuming their operations could participate in the Cypriot Fourth Division. So, AEK's application to participate in the fourth division was accepted.
Levadiakos/Salamina Livadion also secured their participation in the 2011–12 Cypriot Fourth Division through the amateur divisions. However, Cyprus Football Association decided that the team did not meet basic requirements for the registering as a member of the federation. After an extraordinary general meeting it was decided that the team was eventually able to join the Cyprus Football Association. But, because the 2011–12 Cypriot Fourth Division had already began, it was decided that the team would book a place to the 2012–13 Cypriot Fourth Division, the next seasons' championship.

Stadia and locations

League standings

Results

Playoff

Source: Result at CFA

See also
 Cypriot Fourth Division
 2011–12 Cypriot First Division
 2011–12 Cypriot Cup for lower divisions
 Cypriot football league system

Sources
 

Cypriot Fourth Division seasons
Cyprus
2011–12 in Cypriot football